Here is a list of the governors of the State Bank of Pakistan.

List of governors

See also 

 State Bank of Pakistan
 Planning Commission (Pakistan)
 Economy of Pakistan

References 

 Profile of Past Governors of State Bank of Pakistan

 
Pakistani government officials
Pakistan
Governors of the State Bank of Pakistan
Governors of the State Bank of Pakistan